William Shepherd (9 August 1840 – 27 May 1919) was an English first-class cricketer active 1864–68 who played for Surrey. He was born in Kennington; died in Tooting.

References

1840 births
1919 deaths
English cricketers
Surrey cricketers